The Matahaka River is a river of the Bay of Plenty Region of New Zealand.

See also
List of rivers of New Zealand

References

Rivers of the Bay of Plenty Region
Rivers of New Zealand